The Papua New Guinea University of Technology (Unitech) is a university located in Lae, Morobe Province of Papua New Guinea.

Courses offered
Unitech offers courses in the following fields:
Agriculture
Architecture
Construction Management (Previously Building in 2019 and back)
Applied Sciences
Chemistry
Food Technology
Physics
Business Studies 
Accountancy
Management
Economics
Information Technology
Communication for Development Studies
Computer Science
Engineering
Civil
Communications
Electrical
There are two bachelor's degree's offered by the Electrical Engineering department. The Communications Engineering and Electrical Engineering. Student's specialise in their chosen field during the final year of studies. This is a four year course.
Mechanical
Mining
Forestry 
Forestry has both a 2-year diploma program and a 4-year degree program. Students undertaking bachelor of science in forestry usually do their first year at the main campus (Taraka), second and third years at Bulolo Forestry College (with the diploma students) and then final year back at the main campus.
Mathematics
Surveying

See also
List of forestry universities and colleges

References

External links
University of Technology 

1965 establishments in Papua New Guinea
Universities in Papua New Guinea
Technical universities and colleges
Morobe Province
Educational institutions established in 1965
Lae